Joachim Weimann (born February 14, 1956) is a German economist. He is currently the chair for Economic Policy at the Otto-von-Guericke University Magdeburg. Weimann's research interests include environmental economics and behavioral economics.

Career
Born in Düsseldorf, Northrhine-Westphalia, Weimann attended the University of Bielefeld. He earned his doctoral degree in 1987, and his Habilitation in 1992, both from the University of Dortmund. In 1994 he was offered a professorship at the University of Magdeburg. Among his doctorate students was Axel Ockenfels.

Other activities
 Verein für Socialpolitik, Member 
 Wirtschaftsdienst, Member of the Scientific Advisory Board

References

External links
 Joachim Weimann's website at the University of Magdeburg

1956 births
Living people
Writers from Düsseldorf
German economists
Environmental economists
Technical University of Dortmund alumni